The Dragon World Championship is an international biennial sailing regatta in the Dragon class organized by the International Sailing Federation and the International Dragon Association.

Several sailors have won twice; Jesper Bank, Johan Palmqvist, Ole Børresen, Poul Richard Høj Jensen, Vincent Hoesch, Erik Hansen all have two titles. The most championships has been won by the Danish crew, with 8 editions.

The Dragon was an Olympic class from 1948 to 1972.

History
The first Dragon World Championships were held in 1965.

Editions

All-time medal table

Medalists

References

See also
ISAF Sailing World Championships
International Sailing Federation

 
Recurring sporting events established in 1965